Achaea praestans, the orange-bordered achaea, is a moth of the family Erebidae. The species was first described by Achille Guenée in 1852. It is found in South Africa, Ethiopia, Eswatini, Kenya, Madagascar, Malawi, Mozambique, Tanzania and Zimbabwe.

It has a wingspan of 54 mm.

References

External links
"Achaea praestans (Guenée, 1852)". African Moths. Retrieved December 15, 2019.

Achaea (moth)
Lepidoptera of Ethiopia
Lepidoptera of Kenya
Lepidoptera of Malawi
Lepidoptera of Mozambique
Lepidoptera of South Africa
Lepidoptera of Tanzania
Lepidoptera of Zimbabwe
Moths of Madagascar
Moths of Sub-Saharan Africa
Moths described in 1852
Taxa named by Achille Guenée